Web Slices are a web feed technology based on the hAtom Microformat that allows users to subscribe to portions of a web page. Microsoft developed the Web Slice format, and published a specification under their Open Specification Promise.    The specification is not published by any independent standards body. Introduced in Internet Explorer 8 Beta 1, Web Slices can be previewed in a fly-out window. , Internet Explorer 8 and 9 were the only browsers to support Web Slices natively, although Mozilla Firefox had support via an add-on called webchunks.

Implementation 
A Web Slice has 9 properties: the Web Slice id, entry title, entry content, end time, alternative display source, alternative navigation, alternative update source, and time to live.
The 3 required properties are: the Web Slice id, entry title, and entry content.

To disable Web Slices on a web page, add:
<meta name="slice" scheme="IE" content="off"/>

To specify the default web slice on a page with multiple web slices, add:
<link
    rel="default-slice"
      <!-- Must be "default-slice" -->
    type="application/x-hatom" 
      <!-- Must be "application/x-hatom" -->
    href="id of webslice"
      <!-- The ID of the web slice -->
/>

Sample Webslice 
<div class="hslice" id = "hslice-id goes here">
  <!-- The ID of the hSlice -->
    <div style="display:none" class=<"entry-title">Title goes here</div>
      <-- The title -->
    <span class>="ttl" style="display:none">360</span>
      <!-- How often to refresh in minutes -->
    <abbr class="endtime" title="10 Jan 2020 00:00:00 UTC"></abbr>
      <!-- When the link expires -->
    <div class="entry-content">
        The content goes here
</div>

Support

Mozilla Firefox 

While Firefox does not have built in support for web slices, extensions have been created to give the ability to read web slices.

WebChunks 
WebChunks is a Mozilla Firefox 3 implementation of Microsoft Webslices. It allows you to "follow" an area of a web page through a dedicated feed bookmarked in a new toolbar. With Greasemonkey, WebChunks can insert webchunks or webslices markup into any web page so the Webchunks extension handles it.

Fireclip 
Fireclip is a Firefox addon that lets you "clip out" parts of a website and watch them for changes. It lets you track specific parts of a website in a similar manner to web slices.

PageSlices 
Pageslices was another Firefox addon that allowed not only storing parts of websites but also organizing them by adding on custom pages.

Google Chrome 
Google Chrome, like Firefox, does not have built in support for web slices. However, the extension API new to Chrome 4 allows extensions to be created to give the ability to relatively simply create arbitrary webslices of any content from any page.

Opera 
Although it was rumored that Opera 10 would have support for web slices, this did not come to pass. Opera does have a "widgetize" feature likened to web slices which allows web pages to be displayed on a user's desktop.

See also 
 Live bookmarks

References

External links 
 Subscribing to Content with Web Slices, MSDN
 Web Slices, MSDN
 Live Search Web Slices for Internet Explorer 8, Windows Experience Blog
 Internet Explorer 8 Web Slices, IE8 Videos on YouTube
 Web Slices Video, Microsoft Internet Explorer 8 Videos
 Add-ons Gallery: Web Slices, Internet Explorer 8 Add-ons

Development 
 Web Slice Format Specification - Version 0.9, MSDN
 Create a dynamic Web Slice in 5 minutes, IE8 Blog
 Internet Explorer 8 Web Slice Style Guide, MSDN
 Web Slices, Internet Explorer 8 Readiness Toolkit
 WebSlices, Internet Explorer 8 Beta 1 Whitepapers 
 Internet Explorer 8 for Developers: Web Slices, MSDEV.com 

Internet Explorer
Web syndication